Aakhri Daku is a 1978 Hindi movie produced by Shanti Sagar and directed by Prakash Mehra. The film stars Randhir Kapoor, Vinod Khanna, Rekha, Reena Roy, Sujit Kumar, Ranjeet, Keshto Mukherjee and Paintal. The music to the film is by Kalyanji-Anandji.

Cast 
Randhir Kapoor as Bhola
Vinod Khanna as Mangal Singh
Rekha
Reena Roy as Champa
Sujit Kumar
Ranjeet
Paintal
Agha
Keshto Mukherjee
P. Jairaj
Mumtaz Begum
Dulari
Helen as Courtesan

Soundtrack

References

External links 
 

1978 films
1970s Hindi-language films
Films directed by Prakash Mehra
Films scored by Kalyanji Anandji